Mohammad Nader Aimi (born March 3, 1982) is an Afghan football player. He has played for the Afghanistan national team.

National team statistics

External links

1982 births
Living people
Afghan men's footballers

Association football goalkeepers
Afghanistan international footballers